The twenty-second cycle of America's Next Top Model (subtitled as America's Next Top Model: Guys & Girls) premiered on August 5, 2015 and is the sixteenth and final cycle to air on The CW. The network announced in mid-October that they were cancelling the show and the finale episode aired on December 4, 2015.

Like the two previous cycles, cycle 22 featured both male and female contestants. However, for the first time since cycle 13, the height restriction was removed and the competition was opened to contestants at any height. Tyra Banks, Kelly Cutrone and J. Alexander returned to the judging panel, with photographer Yu Tsai remaining as creative director. Unlike the last three cycles, social media was no longer included on the show. The scoring system remained in place, but only the combined challenge and judges' scores were added into the final tally to determine who would be eliminated.

While there was no international destination for this cycle, the models traveled to Las Vegas for two episodes. This is the second cycle in the series to be shot completely in the United States, after cycle 13.

The winner of the competition was 25-year-old Nyle DiMarco from Washington, D.C. with Mamé Adjei placing as the runner up. DiMarco was the first deaf contestant to win the competition.

Cycle summary

Prizes
Returning prizes included a modeling contract with NEXT Model Management and a spread in Nylon magazine. Zappos became a new prize for the series, and the winner was chosen for a  contract to become the face of the Zappos Couture's 2016 re-launch.

Special guests
This cycle featured guest judges including interior designers Jonathan and Drew Scott, model Chrissy Teigen, fashion editor Joe Zee and cycle 10 winner Whitney Thompson.

Contestants
The cast includes Nyle DiMarco, is noted for being the first deaf contestant in the history of America's Next Top Model and Mamé Adjei, the then-reigning Miss Maryland USA.

(ages stated are at start of contest)

Episodes

Summaries

Call-out order

 The contestant was eliminated
 The contestant was a part of a non-elimination bottom two
 The contestant won the competition

Bottom two

 The contestant was eliminated after their first time in the bottom two
 The contestant was eliminated after their second time in the bottom two
 The contestant was eliminated after their fourth time in the bottom two
 The contestant was eliminated in the final judging and placed third
 The contestant was eliminated in the final judging and placed as the runner-up

Average call-out order
Casting call-out order, comeback first call-out and final episode are not included.

Scoring chart

 Indicates the contestant had the highest score that week.
 Indicates the contestant was eliminated that week.
 Indicates the contestant was in the bottom two that week.
 Indicates the contestant won the competition.

Photo shoot guide
Episode 1 photo shoot: Swimsuits on a double-decker bus (casting)
Episode 2 photo shoot: Semi-nude holding up hashtags (casting)
Episode 3 photo shoot: Nude and bound together in pairs
Episode 4 photo shoot: Extreme posing with war veterans
Episode 5 photo shoot: Unretouched geometrical sportswear
Episode 6 photo shoot: Possessed  and suspended in mid air
Episode 7 commercial: Boom Boom Boom deodorant in pairs
Episode 8 photo shoot: Living Life-Size dolls 
Episode 9 photo shoot: Look-alike editorial with dogs
Episode 10 music video: "BOOTYful" – Tyra Beauty theme song
Episode 12 photo shoot: Cropped and uncropped Fierce-a-gram photos
Episode 13 photo shoot: Night creatures in the dark
Episode 14 photo shoot: Posing with mothers
Episode 15 photo shoots: Nylon magazine spread; Zappos couture campaign

Makeovers
 Stefano – Blonde extension highlights
 Ava – Mullet cut
 Ashley – Tyra Banks inspired pixie cut and dyed brown with contacts
 Courtney – Layered gray ombre with a side fringe and teeth whitened
 Bello – Long black hair extensions
 Justin – Faux hawk fade
 Dustin – Sun kissed blonde
 Hadassah – Hair shaved on one side
 Devin – Shaved near bald and dyed black
 Mikey – Trimmed and lightened
 Lacey – Chic bowl cut with bangs and dyed dark brown
 Mamé – Curly voluminous weave
 Nyle – Trimmed and cleaned up

Notes

References

America's Next Top Model
2015 American television seasons
Television shows filmed in California
Television shows shot in the Las Vegas Valley